An early warning satellite is a satellite designed to rapidly detect ballistic missile launches and thus enable defensive military action. To do this, these satellites use infrared detectors that identify the missile thanks to the heat given off by its engines during the propulsion phase.

This type of satellite was developed in the 1960s in the context of the Cold War in order to activate early warning systems in the target territories of a missile attack. It later became a component of missile defense systems, as well as regulatory control systems for nuclear tests.

Only the two main nuclear powers, Russia and the United States, have a constellation of early warning satellites.

Description 

The objective of an early warning satellite is to detect the launch of a ballistic missile at the beginning of its trajectory, when its detection is possible since its propulsion system gives off heat.

For a typical ICBM fired from a distance of 10,000 km, this propulsive phase lasts about 3 minutes for a total flight time of about 30 minutes. After these first 3 minutes, the flight continues by inertia and the missile becomes practically undetectable by the satellite.

The early warning satellite has the advantage over a radar of being able to scan almost 50% of the Earth's surface if it is at a sufficient altitude and therefore gives the attacked country more time to react compared to a system based solely on radar.

The detection of the missile is carried out by sensors that observe infrared wavelengths corresponding to the temperature of the flames of the missile engines (greater than 1000 °C). The on-board computer that processes the signal must be able to eliminate radiation sources linked to the reflection of sunlight on the ground or in the clouds. The image is magnified by a telescope whose aperture reaches one meter on the latest US satellites.

Programs

United States 

The United States was the first country to attempt to establish a space-based early warning system. The goal was to detect Soviet ballistic missile launches and give 20 to 33 minutes notice of the missile's arrival (against 10 to 25 minutes for the BMEWS ground-based radar network).

The MIDAS satellites were launched between 1960 and 1966, and although they never entered a truly operational phase, they allowed the development of this type of satellite. DSP satellites in geostationary orbit took over in the early 1970s. Several generations of increasingly efficient DSP satellites followed one another until 2007.

Since 2011 the DSPs have been replaced by the SBIRS system, which includes dedicated satellites in geostationary orbit (SBIRS-GEO) and in low Earth orbit (SBIRS-LEO), as well as sensors on board Trumpet satellites for mixed use (wiretapping/warning) located in a Molniya orbit.

Soviet Union and Russia 
The US-K and US-KS satellites developed under the Oko program were the first generation of Soviet early warning satellites. 86 US-K satellites were placed in a Molniya orbit between 1972 and 2010 and 7 US-KS satellites, of a very similar design, were placed in geostationary orbit between 1975 and 1997, the system becoming operational in 1980.

In 1983, a design error in the on-board software of the US-KS satellites led to the so-called fall equinox incident, which consisted of a false nuclear launch warning after a confusion between the heat caused by the reflection of solar radiation in clouds and that released by the launch of a nuclear missile.

Unlike their US counterparts, the US-K and US-KS only detect surface-to-surface ballistic missile launches, due to less sophisticated electronics. Later, the US-KS were replaced by the US-KMO, capable of detecting sea-to-land ballistic missile launches as well. The first of them would be placed in geostationary orbit in 1991.

In the early 1990s, after about ten years of operation, the coverage provided by these satellites was only partial, due to a reduction in the launch rate.

In 2014, the last 3 early warning satellites in service ceased their activities. The US-K satellites were to be replaced starting in 2015 by a new generation of satellites: Tundra (EKS).

Other countries 
In France, the Direction générale de l'Armement carried out preliminary tests for the development of an early warning satellite. Infrared sensors were tested on two small experimental SPIRALE satellites launched in 2009. However, an operational satellite was not expected to be launched before the end of 2020.

China operates Huoyan-1 series satellites under the Tongxin Jishu Shiyan (TJS) program.

Satellite series

See also 
 Missile defense
 Militarisation of space
 Space force
 Space domain awareness
 Space warfare

References

Bibliography 
 

Infrared technology
Military satellites
Satellites